Plestiodon parvulus, the southern pygmy skink, is a species of lizard which is endemic to Mexico.

References

parvulus
Reptiles of Mexico
Reptiles described in 1933
Taxa named by Edward Harrison Taylor